"The Feels" is a song recorded by South Korean girl group Twice. It was released on October 1, 2021, through JYP Entertainment and Republic Records as the group's first original English single.

Background 
Prior to the release of "The Feels", Twice has released songs recorded in English, including the English versions of "Cry for Me", "I Can't Stop Me", and "More & More". On June 15, 2018, they released a cover of the Jackson 5's 1969 single "I Want You Back". It was released as a digital single and recorded in its original English lyrics. The cover later appeared on their first Japanese album, BDZ, as the tenth and final track, and was featured in the 2018 Japanese film Sensei Kunshu. On November 20, 2019, they released their second Japanese album, &Twice, which features the group's first original English-language track, "What You Waiting For".

Following the release of their tenth EP, Taste of Love, Twice announced on June 25, 2021, that their first official English single will be released on a Friday in September. The single's title was not revealed until August 6, when they posted a photo teaser showing someone holding a letter. On August 23, JYP Entertainment announced October 1 to be the release date of "The Feels" through an 11-second videoclip.

Composition 

"The Feels" was written by Anna Timgren, Boy Matthews, Justin Reinstein, and Woo Min Lee "collapsedone". Reinstein and collapsedone also handled its production. According to JYP Entertainment, the song is "a fast-tempo disco pop track that combines groovy bass sounds and disco synth beats". Running for 3 minutes and 18 seconds, it is composed in the key of B minor (while borrowing from the parallel Dorian mode) with a tempo of 120 beats per minute.

In an interview with Bustle, Momo described "The Feels" as a "bold introduction" to a "new chapter" in their career. "Not only is this song very addictive — it has great hooks — but it shows who we are. It shows our colors and our style", Chaeyoung added. The song was in part meant to cater Twice's international audience, especially those from the United States.

Critical reception 
"The Feels" received acclaim from music critics. Rhian Daly of NME gave it a five-star rating, describing the song as "an infectiously fun bop" and hoped that Twice would get the attention that they deserve in the West. The New Universitys Bailey Kanthatham wrote that the song is a "bubbly, high-energy track tailor-made for the American market" and hoped the song "will finally give [JYP Entertainment] the success in America that it has been craving for after over a decade of trying". For Atwood Magazine, Danny Vagnoni contrasted "The Feels" with Twice's second Korean studio album, Eyes Wide Open, as it took an opposite direction from the album—which he described as a "catalogue of darker, minor key tracks"—and gave something that resembles "their early tracks". Allison S. Park of The Harvard Crimson praised the song's "excellent job of encompassing the all-consuming nature of love through its obsessive yet clichéd lyrics" and acknowledged Twice's "dependable character as a top K-pop group". Mashable named "The Feels" as "[one] of the best, most influential K-pop performances of 2021".

Year-end lists

Commercial performance 
"The Feels" debuted at number 12 on the Billboard Global 200, making it Twice's highest performing song on the chart. In Canada, it debuted at number 56 on the Canadian Hot 100, the group's second entry on the chart after "Feel Special". In Japan, it peaked at number 3 on both the Billboard Japan Hot 100 and Oricon's Combined Singles Chart. In South Korea, "The Feels" peaked at number 94 on the Gaon Digital Chart and at number 56 on the K-pop Hot 100. "The Feels" became Twice's first song to appear on the Billboard Hot 100 and the UK Singles Chart, peaking at numbers 83 and 80, respectively. The song also charted in New Zealand, Malaysia, and Singapore. In January 2022, the song landed at no. 40 on the US Mainstream Top 40, marking Twice's first appearance on the chart.

"The Feels" accumulated 50.9 million global streams and 8,800 global downloads in its first week. In the United States alone, the song garnered 4.7 million streams, 208,000 radio impressions, and 10,400 digital sales in its first week.

In 2022, "The Feels" received a Gold certification from the Recording Industry Association of America (RIAA).

Release and promotion 
The first concept photo for "The Feels" was uploaded on September 3, 2021. Pre-orders for the single began on the same day. Twice held a question and answer event on Twitter on the day of the single's release.

Jeongyeon, who went on hiatus due to panic and anxiety disorder, was not able to join the group during the song's promotion.

Live performances 
Twice appeared on The Tonight Show Starring Jimmy Fallon, GMA3: What You Need to Know, and The Late Show with Stephen Colbert with a performance of "The Feels".

Music video 
The music video of "The Feels" was uploaded on October 1, 2021. Directed by Oui Kim, the video starts off with members receiving an invitation to a prom. Their sixth anniversary week, third Korean studio album (sixth overall) and fourth world tour were teased at the end of the music video. The music video peaked at number one on YouTube's weekly ranking of the most-viewed music videos in the world, replacing Blackpink member Lisa's performance video for her song, "Money".

Korean version 
The Korean version of the song serves as the fifteenth track for the physical edition of Formula of Love: O+T=<3, Twice's third Korean studio album. The Korean lyrics were written by Chaeyoung.

Accolades

Track listing 
Digital download / streaming
"The Feels" – 3:18
"The Feels" (The Stereotypes Remix) – 3:22
"The Feels" (Yves V Remix) – 2:15
"The Feels" (Instrumental) – 3:18
"The Feels" (The Stereotypes Remix Instrumental) – 3:22
"The Feels" (Yves V Remix Instrumental) – 2:15

Remixes EP
"The Feels" (Benny Benassi Remix) – 3:05
"The Feels" – 3:18
"The Feels" (The Stereotypes Remix) – 3:22
"The Feels" (Yves V Remix) – 2:15
"The Feels" (Instrumental) – 3:18
"The Feels" (Benny Benassi Remix Extended) – 4:09
"The Feels" (The Stereotypes Remix Instrumental) – 3:22
"The Feels" (Yves V Remix Instrumental) – 2:15
"The Feels" (Benny Benassi Remix Instrumental) – 3:04

Credits and personnel 
Credits adapted from Melon.

Recording 
 Recorded at JYPE Studios (Seoul, South Korea)
 Mixed at Mirrorball Studios (North Hollywood, California)
 Mastered at 821 Sound Mastering (South Korea)

Personnel 

 Twice – vocals
 Anna Timgren – songwriter
 Boy Matthews – songwriter
 Justin Reinstein – producer, songwriter
 Woo Min Lee "collapsedone" – producer, songwriter
 Sophia Pae – background vocals
 Sehee Eom – recording engineer
 Lee Sang-yeop – recording engineer
 Tony Maserati – mixer
 David K Younghyun – assistant mixer
 Kwon Namwoo – mastering engineer
 John Hanes – mix engineer

Charts

Weekly charts

Year-end charts

Certifications

Release history

Notes

References 

2021 singles
2021 songs
English-language South Korean songs
JYP Entertainment singles
Republic Records singles
Twice (group) songs